Scarth is an unincorporated community in southwestern Manitoba, Canada. It is located approximately 13 kilometers (8 miles) south of Virden, Manitoba in the Rural Municipality of Pipestone.

References 

Unincorporated communities in Westman Region